The following is a list of Teen Choice Award winners and nominees for Choice Sci-Fi/Fantasy TV Actor. The award was first introduced (along with Choice Sci-Fi/Fantasy TV Actress and Choice Sci-Fi/Fantasy TV Show) in 2010. Paul Wesley was the first recipient of the award.

The Choice Sci-Fi/Fantasy TV Actor has been won by Ian Somerhalder the most times, with four wins. Somerhalder and Wesley are the most nominated actors with seven nominations each, both actors for The Vampire Diaries.

The current winner as Choice Sci-Fi/Fantasy TV Actor is Jared Padalecki for Supernatural (2019).

Winners and nominees

2010s

Most wins 
The following individuals received two or more Choice Sci-Fi/Fantasy TV Actor awards:

4 Wins

 Ian Somerhalder

2 Wins

 Jared Padalecki

Most nominations 
The following individuals received two or more Choice Sci-Fi/Fantasy TV Actor nominations:

7 Nominations

 Ian Somerhalder
 Paul Wesley

6 Nominations

 Jared Padalecki

5 Nominations

 Joseph Morgan

4 Nominations

 Bob Morley

3 Nominations

 Jensen Ackless
 Joshua Jackson

2 Nominations

 Stephen Amell
 Matthew Daddario
 Tom Welling
 Dominic Sherwood

References

Sci-Fi/Fantasy Actor